One Hunid is the only album from the short-lived hip hop group The Product. Veteran southern rapper Scarface recruited two young MC's, Willie Hen and Young Malice, to join him for the release. The album features the singles "I'm A" and "G Type".

Track listing

Chart positions

References

2006 albums
Scarface (rapper) albums
Albums produced by the Alchemist (musician)